War Memorial Stadium, colloquially known as The Rockpile, was an outdoor football, baseball and soccer stadium in Buffalo, New York. Opened in 1937 as Roesch Memorial Stadium, the venue was later known as Grover Cleveland Stadium and Civic Stadium. The stadium was home to the Canisius Golden Griffins (NCAA), Buffalo Indians-Tigers (AFL), Buffalo Bills (AAFC), Buffalo Bulls (NCAA), Buffalo Bills (AFL/NFL), Buffalo Bisons (IL), Buffalo White Eagles (ECPSL), Buffalo Blazers (NSL), Buffalo Bisons (EL/AA) and Canisius Golden Griffins (NCAA). It also had a race track and hosted several NASCAR events. The venue was demolished in 1989 and replaced with the Johnnie B. Wiley Amateur Athletic Sports Pavilion, which retains entrances from the original stadium.

History

Planning and construction
Roesch Memorial Stadium was built on the East Side of Buffalo for $3 million as a Works Progress Administration project in 1937. It was built on a large, rectangular block that had once housed the Prospect Reservoir.

Opening and reception

The 36,500-seat venue was primarily used for college football when it opened on October 16, 1937, with the Tulane Green Wave defeating the Colgate Raiders 7–6 in the inaugural game. The venue's name was changed to Grover Cleveland Stadium in 1937 and then to Civic Stadium in 1938. The Buffalo Indians-Tigers became the venue's first professional football team in 1940.

Alterations
A quarter mile cinder oval race track was added to the interior perimeter of the venue in 1940 for auto racing. Both midget car racing and stock car racing were popular at the venue, attracting NASCAR events in 1956 and 1958. Due to the small size of the track, drivers were forced to leave the venue to make pit stops at nearby Masten Armory. Fans were also forbidden from sitting in the first five rows of the venue for safety reasons.

Buffalo was awarded an expansion franchise by the Continental League of Major League Baseball in January 1960, and made plans to play at the venue beginning with the 1961 season. However, the league folded before the season began. The Buffalo Bisons remained in the International League and began play at the newly renamed War Memorial Stadium in 1961, as their previous home of Offermann Stadium had already been slated for demolition.

The venue's race track was removed in 1960 so that the stadium could accommodate both baseball and football for the Buffalo Bisons and Buffalo Bills. The stadium's baseball diamond had an unorthodox southeast alignment (home plate to center field). The east-west alignment of the football field was also unorthodox, running along the third base line.

The stadium was expanded to hold 46,306 fans in 1965.

The venue was poorly maintained, lending to its nickname of "The Rockpile". Brock Yates of Sports Illustrated jokingly wrote in 1969 that the stadium, "looks as if whatever war it was a memorial to had been fought within its confines."

While the Buffalo Bills were popular and regularly filled the venue, the Buffalo Bisons struggled to attract crowds. The Bisons moved mid-season in 1970 and became the Winnipeg Whips.

The stadium was deemed unsuitable for National Football League play after the AFL–NFL merger, as it sat fewer than the combined league's 50,000 seat requirement for venues and was unable to be expanded. Rich Stadium was constructed for the Bills in suburban Orchard Park, where the team moved after the 1972 season.

The venue sat vacant until 1976 when the Buffalo Blazers of the National Soccer League began play. A new Buffalo Bisons franchise was founded in 1979 that returned baseball to the venue. That same year, Canisius College signed a 10-year agreement to use the venue for its college events.

The Natural was filmed at the venue in 1983.

Closing and demolition

The Bisons moved to newly constructed Pilot Field following the 1987 season. The final event at the venue saw the Akron Zips defeat the Canisius Golden Griffins 11–2 on May 6, 1989. Canisius moved its football and baseball teams to the newly built Demske Sports Complex.

War Memorial Stadium was demolished in 1989 and replaced with the Johnnie B. Wiley Amateur Athletic Sports Pavilion, a high school athletic field. Built in 1992 for $6.8 million, the complex incorporates the original entrances from War Memorial Stadium. It was previously home to the Buffalo Gladiators, an amateur football team.

The original flag pole from center field at War Memorial Stadium was preserved and installed at Pilot Field in July 1990, where it stands to this day.

Notable events

Football
A preseason neutral site Canadian Football League game between the Hamilton Tiger-Cats and the Toronto Argonauts took place at the venue on August 11, 1951. Hamilton defeated Toronto by a score of 17–11.

The venue was host to the Coaches All-America Game from 1961 to 1965. Originally called the Graduation Bowl in its inaugural year, the game was an exhibition between the best college seniors in America who were turning professional.

The stadium hosted three postseason American Football League games:

 1963 AFL Eastern Division playoff: Boston Patriots defeated the Buffalo Bills 26–8 on December 28, 1963
 1964 AFL Championship Game: Buffalo Bills defeated the San Diego Chargers 20–7 on December 26, 1964
 1966 AFL Championship Game: Kansas City Chiefs defeated the Buffalo Bills 31–7 on January 1, 1967

Baseball

The stadium hosted two Major League Baseball exhibitions:

 International League All-Stars defeated the New York Yankees 5–0 on August 19, 1963
 Cleveland Indians and Toronto Blue Jays played to an 8–8 tie on April 5, 1987

A touring Old-Timers' Game staged Buffalo's Grand Old Game at the venue on June 23, 1984. The American League All-Stars defeated the National League All-Stars 6–1.

NASCAR
The stadium hosted two NASCAR events:

 NASCAR Convertible Division event on July 7, 1956 won by Joe Weatherly
 NASCAR Grand National event on July 19, 1958 won by Jim Reed

See also
Buffalo Memorial Auditorium

References

External links
Johnnie B. Wiley Amateur Athletic Sports Pavilion
A Visual Tour of the Ol' Rockpile
War Memorial Stadium on Baseball Parks of the Minor Leagues

1937 establishments in New York (state)
1989 disestablishments in New York (state)
American Football League venues
American Football League (1940) venues
American football venues in New York (state)
Baseball venues in New York (state)
Buffalo Bills stadiums
Buildings and structures demolished in 1989
Canisius Golden Griffins baseball
Canisius Golden Griffins football
Defunct American football venues in the United States
Defunct baseball venues in the United States
Defunct college baseball venues in the United States 
Defunct college football venues
Defunct minor league baseball venues
Defunct National Football League venues
Defunct soccer venues in the United States
Demolished sports venues in New York (state)
High school baseball venues in the United States
High school football venues in the United States
NASCAR tracks
Soccer venues in New York (state)
Sports venues completed in 1937
Sports venues demolished in 1989
Sports venues in Buffalo, New York
Works Progress Administration in New York (state)